On 27 November 1912, amidst the French conquest of Morocco and in the aftermath of the Agadir Crisis, the Treaty Between France and Spain Regarding Morocco was signed by the French Third Republic and the Kingdom of Spain. According to the treaty, parts of Morocco would become a Spanish protectorate from 1912 to 1956, when the country regained its independence.

List

(Dates in italics indicate de facto continuation of office)

See also
 French protectorate in Morocco
 List of French residents-general in Morocco
 Spanish Sahara
 List of colonial governors of Spanish Sahara
 Spanish West Africa

References

Sources
 http://www.rulers.org/rulm2.html#morocco
 African States and Rulers, John Stewart, McFarland
 Heads of State and Government, 2nd Edition, John V da Graca, MacMillan Press (2000)

Spanish high commissioners
Spanish high commissioners
Spanish high commissioners
Spanish